Pobre Diabla may refer to:
Pobre Diabla (Mexican TV series), a 2009 telenovela
Pobre Diabla (Peruvian TV series), a 2000 telenovela
"Pobre Diabla", a song by Don Omar from the album The Last Don Live